The following squads and players competed in the men's handball tournament at the 2000 Summer Olympics.

Australia
The following players represented Australia:

 Brendon Taylor
 Cristian Bajan
 Darryl McCormack
 David Gonzalez
 Dragan Sestic
 Karim Shehab
 Kristian Groenintwoud
 Lee Schofield
 Milan Slavujevic
 Peter Bach
 Rajan Pavlovic
 Russell Garnett
 Sasa Sestic
 Taip Ramadani
 Vernon Cheung

Cuba
The following players represented Cuba:

 Amauris Cardenas
 Damian Cuesta
 Diego Wong
 Félix Romero
 Freddy Suárez
 José Hernández
 Juan González
 Luis Silveira
 Miguel Montes
 Misael Iglesias
 Odael Marcos
 Raúl Hardy
 Rolando Uríos
 Yunier Noris

Egypt
The following players represented Egypt:

 Ahmed Belal
 Amro El-Geioushy
 Ashraf Mabrouk Awaad
 Ayman El-Alfy
 Hany El-Fakharany
 Hazem Awaad
 Saber Hussein
 Hussain Said
 Hussain Zaky
 Magdy Abou El-Magd
 Mohamed Bakir El-Nakib
 Gohar Al-Nil
 Sherif Moemen
 Marwan Ragab
 Mohamed Sharaf El-Din

France
The following players represented France:

 Andrej Golic
 Bertrand Gille
 Bruno Martini
 Cédric Burdet
 Christian Gaudin
 Didier Dinart
 Grégory Anquetil
 Guéric Kervadec
 Guillaume Gille
 Jackson Richardson
 Jérôme Fernandez
 Marc Wiltberger
 Olivier Girault
 Patrick Cazal
 Stéphane Joulin

Germany
The following players represented Germany:

 Bernd Roos
 Bogdan Wenta
 Christian Schwarzer
 Daniel Stephan
 Florian Kehrmann
 Frank von Behren
 Henning Fritz
 Jan Holpert
 Jörg Kunze
 Klaus-Dieter Petersen
 Markus Baur
 Mike Bezdicek
 Stefan Kretzschmar
 Sven Lakenmacher
 Volker Zerbe

Russia
The following players represented Russia:

 Dmitry Filippov
 Vyacheslav Gorpishin
 Oleg Khodkov
 Eduard Koksharov
 Denis Krivoshlykov
 Vasily Kudinov
 Stanislav Kulinchenko
 Dmitry Kuzelev
 Andrey Lavrov
 Igor Lavrov
 Sergey Pogorelov
 Pavel Sukosyan
 Dmitri Torgovanov
 Aleksandr Tuchkin
 Lev Voronin

Slovenia
The following players represented Slovenia:

 Aleš Pajovič
 Andrej Kastelic
 Beno Lapajne
 Branko Bedekovič
 Gregor Cvijič
 Iztok Puc
 Jani Likavec
 Renato Vugrinec
 Roman Pungartnik
 Rolando Pušnik
 Tettey-Sowah Banfro
 Tomaž Tomšič
 Uroš Šerbec
 Zoran Jovičič
 Zoran Lubej

South Korea
The following players represented South Korea:

 Jo Beom-yeon
 Jo Chi-hyo
 Choi Hyeon-ho
 Hong Gi-il
 Gang Il-gu
 Lee Jae-wu
 Lee Seok-hyeong
 Mun Byeong-uk
 Baek Won-cheol
 Park Jeong-jin
 Park Min-cheol
 Park Seong-rip
 Yun Gyeong-min
 Yun Gyeong-sin

Spain
The following players represented Spain:

 David Barrufet
 Talant Duyshebaev
 Mateo Garralda
 Rafael Guijosa
 Demetrio Lozano
 Enric Masip
 Jordi Núñez
 Jesús Olalla
 Juan Pérez
 Xavier O'Callaghan
 Antonio Carlos Ortega
 Antonio Ugalde
 Iñaki Urdangarín
 Alberto Urdiales
 Andrei Xepkin

Sweden
The following players represented Sweden:

 Magnus Andersson
 Martin Boquist
 Martin Frändesjö
 Mathias Franzén
 Peter Gentzel
 Andreas Larsson
 Ola Lindgren
 Stefan Lövgren
 Staffan Olsson
 Johan Petersson
 Tomas Svensson
 Tomas Sivertsson
 Pierre Thorsson
 Ljubomir Vranjes
 Magnus Wislander

Tunisia
The following players represented Tunisia:

 Ali Madi
 Anouar Ayed
 Dhaker Seboui
 Haikel Meguennem
 Issam Tej
 Makrem Jerou
 Mohamed Madi
 Mohamed Messaoudi
 Mohamed Riadh Sanaa
 Oualid Ben Amor
 Ouissem Bousnina
 Ouissem Hmam
 Slim Zehani
 Sobhi Sioud

Yugoslavia
The following players represented Yugoslavia:

 Aleksandar Knežević
 Arpad Šterbik
 Dejan Perić
 Dragan Škrbić
 Goran Đukanović
 Igor Butulija
 Ivan Lapčević
 Nebojša Golić
 Nedeljko Jovanović
 Nenad Peruničić
 Petar Kapisoda
 Ratko Nikolić
 Ratko Đurković
 Vladan Matić
 Žikica Milosavljević

References

2000